The free area of the Republic of China, also known as the "Taiwan Area of the Republic of China", "Tai-Min Area (Taiwan and Fuchien)" or simply the "Taiwan Area", is a term used by the government of the Republic of China (ROC) to refer to the territories under its actual control.

The area currently under the definition consists of the island groups of Taiwan, Penghu, Kinmen, Matsu and some minor islands. This term is used in the "Additional Articles of the Constitution of the Republic of China". The collective term "Tai-Peng-Kin-Ma" is literally equivalent except that it only refers to the islands of Taiwan, Penghu, Kinmen and Matsu Area, to the exclusion of the South China Sea possessions—Pratas Island (Tungsha/Dongsha) and Taiping Island.

The term is complementary to "Mainland Area", which is practically viewed as being synonymous to mainland China, despite the fact that the ROC constitutional definition of Mainland Area was a more extensive concept which also include Outer Mongolia, Tannu Uriankhai, and Badakhshan etc.

Background 
The term "free area" or "Free China" was used during the Second Sino-Japanese War (1937–45) to describe the territories under the control of the Kuomintang led Nationalist Government in Chungking (today Chongqing), as opposed to the parts of China under Japanese occupation, including Nanking (today Nanjing) the capital of the Republic of China until the Japanese invasion in 1937.

The Japanese occupation ended with the imperial surrender in 1945, but the term "Free China" was soon to acquire a new meaning in the context of the early Cold War. Following the Communist Party's victory in the Chinese Civil War in 1949, the newly inaugurated People's Republic of China solidified its control of mainland China, while the Kuomintang government retreated to Taiwan and selected Taipei to serve as the provisional capital of the Republic of China. Mainland China was officially considered to be in a state of "Communist Rebellion", also known as "Communist China" or "Red China", and furthermore all territories still under Nationalist administration were said to constitute the "Free Area" of China, also known as "Nationalist China" or "Free China". This period of mobilization was officially terminated by the government on 1 May 1991 with the implementation of the Additional Articles of the Constitution.

Prior to the Battle of Dachen Archipelago in 1955, the Free Area also encompassed a group of islands off Zhejiang, up to then part of the ROC province of Chekiang. The islands have since been administered exclusively by the People's Republic of China.

Nomenclature 
Various names used to describe the geopolitical area include:

Legal use 
The term "free area of the Republic of China" has persisted to the present day in the ROC legislation. The Additional Articles of the Constitution of the Republic of China delegates numerous rights to exercise the sovereignty of the state, including that of electing the President and Legislature, to citizens residing in the "free area of the Republic of China". This term was put into the Constitution with the promulgation of the first set of amendments to the Constitution in 1991 and has been retained in the most recent revision passed in 2005.

The need to use the term "free area" in the Constitution arose out of the discrepancy between the notion that the Republic of China was the sole legitimate government of China and the pressures of the popular sovereignty movement. In the 1980s and 1990s, there were demands, particularly by the Tangwai movement and other groups opposed to one-party authoritarian KMT rule, to restructure the ROC government, long dominated by mainlanders, to be more representative of the Taiwanese people it governed. For example, until 1991, members of the National Assembly and Legislative Yuan elected in 1948 to serve mainland constituencies remained in their posts indefinitely and the President of the Republic of China was to be elected by this same "ten thousand year parliament" dominated by aging KMT members. However, more conservative politicians, while acquiescing to the need for increased democracy, feared that constitutional changes granting localized sovereignty would jeopardize the ROC government's claims as the legitimate Chinese government and thereby promote Taiwan independence.

While the 1991 revisions of the Constitution granted the sovereignty rights to the Taiwanese people, it did not explicitly name Taiwan and instead used the term "free area" to maintain the notion that the Republic of China encompassed more than Taiwan. In ordinary legislation, the term "Taiwan Area" is usually used, especially in contexts of trade and exchange. In contrast to the "free area" is the "mainland area", which the Act Governing Relations between the People of the Taiwan Area and the Mainland Area defines as "the territory of the Republic of China outside the Taiwan Area". However, on more practical grounds, the "mainland area" refers simply to Mainland China.

In addition, there are two other Acts defining other "areas": the "Hong Kong and Macau Area". The hand-over of these former European colonies to the People's Republic of China necessitated laws governing the relations of the Taiwan Area with them. The Acts are worded in a manner to avoid discussing whether the Republic of China claims sovereignty over Hong Kong and Macau.

Use by People's Republic of China 
Based on the One China policy, the People's Republic of China (PRC) does not recognize the legitimacy of ROC. A series of standardized terms called “Taiwan-related terms” were invented by the PRC government, which are used in official statements, news reports, press releases, and education, etc., to serve as this purpose. Among them, the term “Taiwan area” or “Taiwan authority” is commonly used to replace “Republic of China” or “Taiwan” (because mentioning only “Taiwan” but not “Taiwan area” or “Taiwan Province” would give an impression that Taiwan is an independent country). For example, the term “Leader of the Taiwan area” is used to replace “President of the Republic of China” or “President of Taiwan”, “Taiwanese citizens” are replaced with “Residents of Taiwan area”, and Executive Yuan is called “Taiwan area's executive body”, etc.

Administrative divisions

See also 
 Additional Articles of the Constitution of the Republic of China
 Anti-Secession Law of the People's Republic of China
 Constitution of the Republic of China
 History of the Republic of China
 Kuomintang
 Mainland China
 Politics of the Republic of China
 Soviet Zone / Liberated Zone
 Chinese Soviet Republic
 Taiwan Province, People's Republic of China

Notes 

 Words in native languages

References

External links 
 Relations with Hong Kong and Macau
 Relations Between Peoples of the Taiwan Area and the Mainland Area

Geography of Taiwan
Politics of Taiwan
Taiwan Strait